Eranthemum is a genus of plants in the family Acanthaceae. 

The Plant List accepts 22 species:

References

External links
 
 

Acanthaceae
Acanthaceae genera